Kents Store is an unincorporated community in Fluvanna County, in the U.S. state of Virginia.

Laughton and The Oaks are listed on the National Register of Historic Places.

References

Unincorporated communities in Virginia
Unincorporated communities in Fluvanna County, Virginia